Gordon Haddon Clark (August 31, 1902 – April 9, 1985) was an American philosopher and Calvinist theologian. He was a leading figure associated with presuppositional apologetics and was chairman of the Philosophy Department at Butler University for 28 years. He was an expert in pre-Socratic and ancient philosophy and was noted for defending the idea of propositional revelation against empiricism and rationalism, in arguing that all truth is propositional. His theory of knowledge is sometimes called scripturalism.

Biography 

Clark was raised in a Christian home and studied Calvinist thought from a young age. In 1924, he graduated from the University of Pennsylvania with a bachelor's degree in French and earned his doctorate in Philosophy from the same institution in 1929. The following year he studied at the Sorbonne.

He began teaching at the University of Pennsylvania after receiving his bachelor's degree and also taught at the Reformed Episcopal Seminary in Philadelphia. In 1936, he accepted a professorship in Philosophy at Wheaton College, Illinois, where he remained until 1943 when he accepted the Chairmanship of the Philosophy Department at Butler University in Indianapolis. After his retirement from Butler in 1973, he taught at Covenant College in Lookout Mountain, Georgia, and Sangre de Cristo Seminary in Westcliffe, Colorado.

Clark's denominational affiliations would change many times. He was born into and eventually became a ruling elder in the Presbyterian Church in the United States of America. However, he would eventually leave with a small group of conservatives, led by John Gresham Machen, to help form the Presbyterian Church of America (renamed the Orthodox Presbyterian Church in 1938) and would be ordained in the OPC in 1944. However, in 1948, following the Clark-Van Til Controversy, he joined the United Presbyterian Church of North America. Following the UPCNA's 1956 merger with the Presbyterian Church in the United States of America (the same denomination from which the OPC had separated from in 1936) to form the United Presbyterian Church in the United States of America, Clark joined the Reformed Presbyterian Church, General Synod in 1957. Clark was instrumental in arranging a merger between the RPCGS and the Evangelical Presbyterian Church to form the Reformed Presbyterian Church, Evangelical Synod in 1965. When the RPCES became part of the Presbyterian Church in America in 1982, Clark refused to join the PCA and instead entered the unaffiliated Covenant Presbytery in 1984.

Clark was also elected president of the Evangelical Theological Society in 1965.

He died in 1985 and was buried near Westcliffe, Colorado.

Philosophy

Clark's philosophy and theology has been summarized as:
 Epistemology: propositional revelation in the Bible
 Soteriology: faith alone
 Metaphysics: theism
 Ethics: the superiority of divine law over human law/Christian egoism
 Politics: constitutional republic

Personal life

Clark met his future wife Ruth Schmidt during his graduate studies at the University of Pennsylvania; she had actually been baptized by Gordon's father as a baby.  They married in 1929 and stayed together for 48 years until Ruth's death from leukemia in 1977.  They had two daughters, Lois Antoinette (later Lois Zeller, b. 1936) and Nancy Elizabeth (later Betsy Clark George, b. 1941). At the time of his death, Clark was survived by his two daughters and their husbands, 12 grandchildren, and one great grandchild.

Clark was well known as a keen chessplayer. In 1966, he won the championship of the King's Men Chess Club in Indianapolis.

Publications 

Clark was a prolific author who wrote more than forty books, including texts on ancient and contemporary philosophy, volumes on Christian doctrines, commentaries on the New Testament and a one-volume history of philosophy:

Philosophy 
 An Introduction to Christian Philosophy, in which Clark's thought is well summarized in three lectures given at Wheaton College, reissued in Christian Philosophy
 Three Types of Religious Philosophy, reissued in Christian Philosophy
 Thales to Dewey, a history of philosophy
 Ancient Philosophy, Dr. Clark's section of a History of Philosophy, which he co-published with three other authors; also includes eleven major essays, including his doctoral dissertation on Aristotle
 William James and John Dewey
 Behaviorism and Christianity
 Philosophy of Science and Belief in God
 Historiography: Secular and Religious
 A Christian View of Men and Things, which develops Clark's Christian worldview
 A Christian Philosophy of Education
 Logic, a textbook on logic for students
 Essays on Ethics and Politics
 Lord God of Truth printed with Concerning the Teacher by St. Augustine
 Selections from Hellenistic Philosophy edited by Clark
 Readings in Ethics edited by Clark and T. V. Smith
 Clark Speaks from the Grave written just before Clark died and published posthumously, responding to some of his critics

Theology 
 In Defense of Theology
 Religion, Reason, and Revelation, Clark's major work on apologetics
 God's Hammer: The Bible and Its Critics
 What Do Presbyterians Believe?, a commentary on the Westminster Confession of Faith
 Predestination, the combined edition of Biblical Predestination and Predestination in the Old Testament; a study of the idea of election in the Bible
 Karl Barth's Theological Method, a book critical of Barth
 Language and Theology
 The Johannine Logos, on John the Evangelist's use of the term Logos
 Faith and Saving Faith; reissued as What is Saving Faith?
 Today's Evangelism: Counterfeit or Genuine?
 The Biblical Doctrine of Man
 The Incarnation
 The Holy Spirit
 The Atonement
 Sanctification
 The Trinity
 Logical Criticism of Textual Criticism

Commentaries 
 First Corinthians: A Contemporary Commentary
 Ephesians
 Philippians
 Colossians
 First and Second Thessalonians
 The Pastoral Epistles on the first and second letters to Timothy and Titus
 New Heavens, New Earth on the first and second letters of Peter
 First John

Additionally, Ronald Nash edited a Festschrift The Philosophy of Gordon H. Clark (Philadelphia: Presbyterian and Reformed, 1968), which presented a summary of Clark's thought (viz., the Wheaton lectures mentioned above), critiques by several authors, and rejoinders by Clark.

References

Further reading
 Douma, Douglas (2017). The Presbyterian Philosopher: The Authorized Biography of Gordon H. Clark.  Eugene, Oregon: Wipf and Stock. 
 Hoeksema, Herman (1995). The Clark–Van Til Controversy. Hobbs, N.M.: Trinity Foundation.

External links 

The Gordon H. Clark Foundation Working with Dr. Clark's family and friends to release previously unpublished material. Scanned original sources included often.
The Trinity Foundation reprints Clark's works and publishes those of his followers. They have books for sale and articles and audio lectures available for free.
 The Trinity Lectures in MP3 format free for download (but not streaming), including Clark's Lectures in Apologetics, Lectures on Theology, and Lectures on the Holy Spirit.
The Gordon Clark Papers, archived by the Presbyterian Church in America.

1902 births
1985 deaths
Calvinist and Reformed philosophers
Supralapsarians
American Presbyterians
American Calvinist and Reformed theologians
Christian apologists
Writers from Philadelphia
University of Pennsylvania alumni
Wheaton College (Illinois) faculty
20th-century Calvinist and Reformed theologians
Reformed Episcopal Seminary faculty
Butler University faculty
Orthodox Presbyterian Church ministers
Critics of atheism